Portuguese Trinidadians and Tobagonians are the descendants of emigrants from Portugal to Trinidad and Tobago.

History 
Trinidad and Tobago saw four major waves of migration from Portugal. 

Portuguese came to both Tobago and Trinidad as early as the 17th century: some landed in Trinidad in the 1630s. The groups that arrived in Tobago in the 1660s included Portuguese Jews. In fact, some of the Portuguese surnames found in Trinidad and Tobago are generally associated with the marrano community.

The emigration continued in the 19th century; in fact some Portuguese landed in Trinidad in 1811 while others (mainly Azoreans) arrived in 1834. They were the first Portuguese-Caribbean labourers.

The historical background to the second wave, which began in 1846, was an earlier influx of Azorean and Madeiran workers in 1834 following the British abolition of slavery the previous year, along with Scottish Presbyterian evangelism in Madeira in the early 1840s. Seeking to resolve labour shortages in Trinidad, the British government signed a treaty with Portugal covering contract labour migration from Madeira to Trinidad, following which a group of 219 Madeiran contract workers arrived in May 1846, and then 773 more in the remainder of the year. Further migration, beginning in the 1870s, was spurred by a phylloxera infestation in Madeira. 

As a result, the Madeiran community of Trinidad grew to roughly two thousand by the end of the nineteenth century. The migrants comprised both Catholics and Protestants, though many of the Protestants later moved to the United States or Brazil. In the 1930s and again after World War II, there were two further influxes of Portuguese migrants. Migrants and their descendants formed two major ethnic associations, the Portuguese Association (Associação Portuguesa Primeiro de Dezembro) and the Portuguese Club.

Portuguese migrants in those years occupied an intermediate social position: physically, they resembled the largely-upper-class migrants from other European countries, but in terms of socioeconomic status, they were closer to African descendants and Indian migrants. As Miguel Vale de Almeida described it, "[n]either whites nor Blacks considered the Portuguese to be sociologically white" (see Bridget Brereton 1979:34). After 1960, exact statistics on the Portuguese community became unavailable because the census ceased to distinguish Portuguese as a separate group; they were thenceforth counted in the categories "Europeans", "Mixed", or "Others", until 2011 when they were included again in the national census.

Nowadays, the Portuguese language is increasingly learned by 3rd or 4th generation Portuguese descendants, mainly due to economic ties with Brazil, as well as a renewed interest in discovering their origins.

Notable people
Mike Agostini, track and field athlete
Stephen Ames, professional golfer
Isabella Ribeiro de Cabral, pilot
Dylan Carter, swimmer
Pete de Freitas, drummer and producer
 Joshua Da Silva, West Indies cricketer
Captain Gerard 'Frothy' de Silva, sports fishing
Sean de Silva, professional footballer 
Dennis De Souza, musician
Jowelle de Souza, activist
Richard de Souza, cricketer
Sir Errol dos Santos, Colonial Secretary
Joseph Bento (JB) Fernandes, entrepreneur, rum magnate and philanthropist
Ferdinand (Ferdie) Ferreira, politician
Geoffrey Ferreira, swimmer
Roger Gibbon, cyclist
 Albert Gomes, politician, trade unionist, and writer
Larry Gomes, cricketer
Gerry Gomez, cricketer
Compton Gonsalves, cyclist
Drew Gonsalves of Kobo Town, singer and songwriter
Edmund Hart, Carnival designer
Teresa Lourenco (Lourenço), model
Alfred Mendes, novelist and writer
Gene Miles, political activist
Sam Mendes, film and stage director, producer, and screenwriter
Maria Nunes, golfer and photographer
Debra O'Connor, badminton player
Tina Pereira, ballet dancer and designer
Gerry Rodrigues, swimmer and trainer
Eduardo de Sá Gomes, calypso music entrepreneur
Harold Saldenah, Carnival designer
Gene Samuel, cyclist
Geraldo Vieira, Carnival designer
Gabrielle Walcott, artist, model, charity worker and beauty queen

References

Further reading

Portuguese